"The Woman-Identified Woman" was a ten-paragraph manifesto, written by the Radicalesbians in 1970. It was first distributed during the Lavender Menace protest at the Second Congress to Unite Women, on May 1, 1970, in New York City. It is now considered a turning point in the history of radical feminism and one of the founding documents of lesbian feminism.

It was written by Artemis March, Lois Hart, Rita Mae Brown, Ellen Shumsky, Cynthia Funk, and Barbara XX. It was edited by Artemis March. A group of lesbian radical feminists staged a "zap" for the opening session of the Congress, during which they cut the lights, took over the stage and microphone and denounced the exclusion of lesbian speakers at the Congress. They distributed mimeographed copies of "The Woman-Identified Woman", in which they argued that lesbians are at the forefront of the struggle for women's liberation because their identification with other women defies traditional definitions of women's identity in terms of male sexual partners, and expressed, "...the primacy of women relating to women, of women creating a new consciousness of and with each other which is at the heart of women's liberation, and the basis for the cultural revolution." At the following NOW conference, held in New York City in September 1971, the Congress adopted a resolution acknowledging the rights of lesbians as a "legitimate concern for feminism".

Political implications

The manifesto was critical of the potentially regressive nature of the feminist movements in the 1970s, namely neglecting the significance of lesbian voices and the importance of incorporating lesbian ideals in the construction of feminist movements. At its publication in the 1970s, it was seen as a pioneer of lesbianism advocacy in feminist political theories.

The delivery of the manifesto was a watershed moment during the period of second-wave feminism. The primary focus of the period was gender inequality in law and culture. The Radicalesbians argued that mere opposition to patriarchy in American society would be ineffective and inefficient to bring about the triumph of feminism, due to the sheer dominance of patriarchy.

One of the central grievances of the text is women's inability to self-identify; they are instead being prescribed suppressive sexist and heteronormative roles. This view of females, the authors argued, served only to keep a woman down, "poisoning her existence, keeping her alienated from herself, her own needs, and rendering her a stranger to other women."

The manifesto points out that, although changes have occurred in American society for women, these changes are superficial, nominal displays presented to cope with the rising tide of feminism. The manifesto claims the overt political actions of "liberating women" are overshadowed by the covertly oppressive civil actions of men. It also questions the validity of the core ideals of feminism and feminist movements and alerted feminists to the threat of passive feminine argument.

The manifesto established the foundation for lesbians in politics; and, within the realm of feminists, it triggered a ripple effect leading to the emergence of lesbian literature along with feminist writings that further shaped other radical and controversial theories.

Full text online
 "The Woman-Identified Woman" (1970). From Documents from the Women's Liberation Movement, Special Collections Library, Duke University.

References

Sources
 Jay, Karla (1999). Tales of the Lavender Menace: A Memoir of Liberation.
 Faderman, Lillian. The Gay Revolution: The Story of the Struggle. New York: Simon & Schuster, 2015.

1970 in LGBT history
Feminism in New York City
History of women's rights in the United States
Lesbian culture in New York (state)
Lesbian feminist literature
Lesbian history in the United States
LGBT history in New York City
1970s LGBT literature
Radical feminist literature
1970 essays
LGBT literature in the United States